World Series Cricket results are the results of the main games played in the now defunct World Series Cricket (WSC) competition. World Series Cricket was a break away professional cricket competition staged between 1977 and 1979, organized by Kerry Packer for his Australian television network, the Nine Network. The matches ran in opposition to established international cricket. World Series Cricket drastically changed the nature of cricket, and its influence continues to be felt today.The intention for creating World Series Cricket is not to offer the media and broadcasting rights by the Australian cricket board to him and after few years when board agreed to give broadcast rights to kerry packers then he no more interested to run the world series cricket and this how IPL started in India with the same thought and mindset.

WSC involved a three-way competition between the WSC Australia XI, WSC West Indies XI, and WSC World XI, a team composed of players from the other cricketing nations, although a number of West Indian players also played in the World team when they were not playing for the West Indies. Towards the end of the competition a fourth team named the Cavaliers was added for the Country Cavaliers Tour. It was composed of players not selected by the other three sides for that rounds' fixtures; this was a way of making better use of all the players contracted to the competition.

Origin
The series originated due to two main factors—the widespread view that players were not paid sufficient amounts to make a living from cricket, and that Packer wished to secure the exclusive broadcasting rights to Australian cricket, then held by the Australian Broadcasting Corporation (ABC). After the Australian Cricket Board (ACB) refused to accept Channel Nine's bid to gain exclusive television rights to Australia's Test matches in 1976, Packer set up his own series by secretly signing agreements with leading players from the national cricket teams of Australia, England, Pakistan, South Africa, and the West Indies.

Official cricket won a series of minor victories. WSC was unable to call the Australian team "Australia", or use the official rules of cricket, which are copyright of the MCC. The Australian team therefore became "WSC Australia XI", and former Australian captain and leading commentator Richie Benaud took the job of writing rules and playing conditions for the series. WSC was also shut out of traditional cricket venues, so Packer leased two Australian football stadiums, VFL Park in Melbourne and Football Park in Adelaide, a trotting track in Perth, Gloucester Park, and the Sydney Showground.

1977–78
Another of the victories of official cricket was to ban WSC from using the term "Test match". The five-day matches were therefore retitled "Supertests" in WSC.

Supertests
 
The Supertests for the 1977–78 season were five-day matches. Two separate series were played, WSC West Indies XI vs WSC Australia XI, and World XI vs WSC Australia XI.

WSC West Indies XI vs WSC Australia XI

WSC West Indies XI won the series 2–1.

WSC World XI vs WSC Australia XI

WSC World XI won the series 2–1.

International Cup
The International Cup consisted of one-day limited overs matches, with both sides allocated forty overs of eight balls each. Two points were awarded for a win, one for a no result or abandonment. If points were level, combined run rate would determine position. The two top two sides contested the first semi-final. The winner of that match progressed to the final, while the loser played the bottom side in the second semi-final for the other place in the final. The final was a one-off winner-takes-all match.

1st Semi-Final

2nd Semi-Final

Final

1978–79

Supertests
For the 1978–79 season the Supertest format was changed to a round-robin format, with the top team going to the final, and the other two teams playing-off in a semi-final. The Supertests were also changed from the traditional five-day Test match format to four-day day–night matches.

By winning both matches the WSC World XI qualified for the final. A semi-final between WSC Australia and WSC West Indies determined the other finalist.

Semi-Final

Final

International Cup
For the 1978–79 season the limited overs International Cup saw both sides allocated fifty overs of six balls each. Two points were assigned for a win, one for a no result. If teams were level on points, combined run-rate would be used to separate them. The top two teams would contest a best-of-four final series.

A crowd of 44,377 attended the first match of the 1978–79 International Cup, under the new floodlights at the SCG.

Finals

WSC West Indies XI won the finals 3–1.

1979 tour to the West Indies

In 1979, following the tour of New Zealand, the WSC Australians team set off for a more extensive tour to the Caribbean that would encompass five Supertest games and twelve one-day games against the WSC West Indies.

Supertests
For this series the Supertests reverted to a traditional five-day format.

Drawn series 1–1.

References

World Series Cricket